"One Call" is a song by American rapper Gunna, released on February 1, 2019, as the lead single from his debut studio album, Drip or Drown 2.

Background 
Gunna announced the release of the single on January 28, 2019, and it released four days later.

Composition 
The instrumental of the song, produced by Turbo, has been described as sounding like it was "made underwater". Gunna sing-raps about his riches and lifestyle, in an "addictive melody".

Music video 
Directed by Spike Jordan, the music video was released on February 1, 2019, along with the single.

Charts

Certification

References 

2019 singles
2019 songs
300 Entertainment singles
Gunna (rapper) songs
Song recordings produced by Turbo (record producer)
Songs written by Gunna (rapper)
Songs written by Turbo (record producer)